The Arkticheskiy Institut Rocks are a group of rocks lying  north of the Nordwestliche Insel Mountains at the northwest extremity of the Wohlthat Mountains, Queen Maud Land. They were discovered and photographed by the Third German Antarctic Expedition, 1938–39, and mapped by the Soviet Antarctic Expedition, 1960–61, being named for that nation's Arctic Institute.

References 

Rock formations of Queen Maud Land
Princess Astrid Coast